The 2021–22 season was Fulham's 124th season in existence and their first season back in the Championship, following relegation from the Premier League the previous season. Alongside the Championship, the club reached the fourth round of the FA Cup, and the third round of the EFL Cup. The season covers the period from July 2021 to 30 June 2022.

On 19 April 2022, Fulham secured promotion back to the Premier League following a 3–0 home win over Preston North End. With a 7–0 win over Luton Town on 2 May, Fulham were confirmed as champions.

Managerial changes
During pre-season, head coach Scott Parker left the club by mutual consent. Later, he was appointed as new AFC Bournemouth head coach following the sacking of Jonathan Woodgate. Two days later, Portuguese football  manager  Marco Silva was appointed to replace him as head coach on a three-year deal.

Pre-season friendlies
The Whites announced a pre-season friendly against Millwall F.C. as well as Charlton Athletic as part of their preparations for the new season.

Competitions

Championship

League table

Results summary

Results by matchday

Matches
Fulham's fixtures were announced on 24 June 2021.

FA Cup

Fulham were drawn away to Bristol City and Manchester City, in the third and fourth rounds respectively.

EFL Cup

Fulham entered the competition in the second round stage and were drawn away to Birmingham City and at home to Leeds United in the third round.

Squad statistics

Appearances and goals

|-
! colspan=14 style=background:#dcdcdc; text-align:center| Goalkeepers

|-
! colspan=14 style=background:#dcdcdc; text-align:center| Defenders

|-
! colspan=14 style=background:#dcdcdc; text-align:center| Midfielders

|-
! colspan=14 style=background:#dcdcdc; text-align:center| Forwards

|-
! colspan=14 style=background:#dcdcdc; text-align:center|Out on Loan

|-
! colspan=14 style=background:#dcdcdc; text-align:center| Left during Season

Top scorers
Includes all competitive matches. The list is sorted by squad number when total goals are equal.

Last updated 7 May 2022

Transfers

Transfers in

Loans in

Loans out

Transfers out

References

Fulham
Fulham F.C. seasons
Fulham
Fulham